Vincenzo is an Italian male given name, derived from the Latin name Vincentius (the verb vincere means to win or to conquer). Notable people with the name include:

Art 
Vincenzo Amato (born 1966), Italian actor and sculptor
Vincenzo Bellavere (c.1540-1541 – 1587), Italian composer
Vincenzo Bellini (1801–1835), Italian composer
Vincenzo Camuccini (1771–1844), Italian academic painter
Vincenzo Catena (c. 1470 – 1531), Italian painter 
Vincenzo Cerami (1940–2013), Italian screenwriter 
Vincenzo Consolo (1933–2012), Italian writer
Vincenzo Coronelli (1650–1718), Franciscan friar, cosmographer, cartographer, publisher, and encyclopedist 
Vincenzo Crocitti (1949–2010), Italian cinema and television actor
Vincenzo Dimech (1768–1831), Maltese sculptor
Vincenzo Galilei (1520–1591), composer, lutenist, and music theorist, father of Galileo
Vincenzo Marra (born 1972), Italian filmmaker
Vincenzo Migliaro (1858–1938), Italian painter
Vincenzo Natali (born 1969), Canadian film director
Vincenzo Nicoli (born 1958), English actor
Vincenzo Talarico (1909–1972), Italian screenwriter and film actor

Politics
Vincenzo Aita (born 1948), Italian politician
Vincenzo Amendola (born 1973), Italian politician
Vincenzo Arangio-Ruiz (1884–1964), Italian politician 
Vincenzo Balzamo (1929–1992), Italian politician
Vincenzo Gonzaga, Duke of Mantua (1562–1612), ruler of the Duchy of Mantua and the Duchy of Montferrat from 1587 to 1612
Vincenzo II Gonzaga, Duke of Mantua (1594–1627), Duke of Mantua and Duke of Montferrat from 1626 to 1627
Vincenzo Lavarra (born 1954), Italian politician
Vincenzo Scotti (born 1933), Italian politician
Vincenzo Tangorra (1866–1922), Italian academic and politician

Religion 
Vincenzo, Martyr of Craco, minor saint of the Roman Catholic Church
Vincenzo Macchi (1770–1860), Italian cardinal
Vincenzo Maria Sarnelli (1835–1898), Italian archbishop
Vincenzo Vannutelli (1836–1930), Italian cardinal

Sports 
Vincenzo Capelli (born 1988), Italian rower
Vincenzo Cuccia (1892–1979), Italian fencer
Vincenzo Di Bella (born 1977), Italian rally driver
Vincenzo Guerini (athlete) (born 1950), Italian sprinter
Vincenzo Guerini (footballer) (born 1953), Italian football player
Vincenzo Grella, Australian football player
Vincenzo Grifo (born 1993), German-born Italian footballer
Vincenzo Iaquinta (born 1979), Italian football player
Vincenzo Marchese (born 1983), Italian-German football player
Vincenzo Modica (born 1971), Italian long-distance runner
Vincenzo Montella (born 1974), Italian football player
Vincenzo Nibali (born 1984), Italian road bicycle racer
Vincenzo Santopadre (born 1971), Italian tennis player
Vincenzo Sospiri (born 1966), Italian racing driver

Characters 
Justin Vincenzo Pepé Russo, a.k.a. Justin Russo, a character from Wizards of Waverly Place
Vincenzo Cassano, the titular character from Vincenzo (TV series)
Vincenzo Santorini, nicknamed "Vinny", a character from Atlantis: The Lost Empire

Others 
Vincenzo Borg (1777–1837), Maltese merchant and rebel leader
Vincenzo Cilli, the Caporegime of Salvatore Leone in Liberty City Stories
Vincenzo Dandolo (1758–1819) Italian Count, chemist and agriculturist
Vincenzo Gambi (died 1819), 19th-century Italian pirate
Vincenzo Giustiniani (1564–1637), Italian banker, art collector and intellectual 
Vincenzo Peruggia (1881-1925), Italian thief who stole the Mona Lisa
Vincenzo Scamozzi (1548–1616), Italian architect
Vincenzo Viviani (1622–1703), Italian mathematician and scientist
Vincenzo Zappalà (born 1945), Italian astronomer

See also
San Vincenzo (disambiguation), a number of places
DiVincenzo (disambiguation)
Castel San Vincenzo, comune (municipality) in the Province of Isernia in the Italian region Molise
 Enzo, people with the given name
 Vicenza, a city in northeastern Italy
 Vincenz, people with the given name
 Vinzenz, people with the given name

Italian masculine given names